Robert Aylmer (d.1493), of Norwich, Norfolk, was an English politician.

He was a grocer, Sheriff of Norwich in 1471, Alderman of Norwich in 1480, and Mayor of Norwich in 1481 and 1492. He was married to Elizabeth (d.1518).

His will, written on 3 July 1493, included a large donation to St. Giles's Hospital.

His mark, with his initials, is in several of the South windows in the clerestory of St. Andrew's Church, Norwich. His gravestone, dated 1493, lies under the font.Prey for the Soule of Robert Aylmer Citezeyn and Alderman of

the Moneth of July in the Yer of our Lord God m°cccc°

lxxxxiij°. on whose Soule GodNear it lies a stone with an effigies and this,Orate pro anima Elizabethe filie Roberti Aylmer nuper Civis et

Aldermanni Norvici que obiit xv° die Sept. A° Dni. m°cccc°

lxxxxiij°. cuius anime propicietur deus.On a north isle window,Orate pro bono statu Thome Thirsby, et Eliz. Ur. et pro aiab: Johis: et Rob. Aylmer quondam maiorum Civitatis Norwici.

Elizabeth Thursby, widow, buried in the church by alderman Robert Aylmer, her late husband, gave 10 marks towards finishing the church, and her best gilt chalice.

Family 

Children of Robert Aylmer and Elizabeth:
Richard (d. 3rd day before the Ides of September, i.e. 11 September 1512)
 Thomas (d.1500)
 Cecile
 Elizabeth (d. 15 September 1493)

References 

1493 deaths
Politicians from Norwich
Mayors of Norwich